Kaleb "K.One" Vitale is a New Zealand rapper, currently signed to Illegal Musik. The most successful song of his career is featuring with J. Williams on "Night of Your Life" which reached number 4 on the RIANZ charts and received gold certification in 2010.

Personal life
Kaleb is originally from Masterton, in the Wairarapa district of New Zealand, and previously made his living in the forestry industry. He has two daughters named Dream and Summer-Jade.

Music career

2010 - present: debut album
"Never" featuring Junipah was released as the lead single for Vitale's debut album. His next single "Walking Away" featuring Jason Kerrison from Opshop made it to the RIANZ charts at number 38. He also made many singles as a featured artist from which all came from fellow label mates. The most successful one was his song with J. Williams on "Night of Your Life" which peaked at number 4 on the RIANZ charts and received a gold certification. There is also to be a single for his daughters on the album.

In 2012, K.One was the supporting act for New Zealand boy band, Titanium on their Come On Home Tour.

Discography

Studio albums

Mixtapes

Singles

Featured singles

References

Year of birth missing (living people)
Living people
New Zealand rappers